The PNS Mehran is the naval station and the premier air–to-air/air–to–ground training naval air station located in the joint vicinity of the Faisal Air Force Base (Faisal AFB) in Karachi, Sindh, in Pakistan. Established in 1975 with the cooperation of the Pakistan Air Force, the PNS Mehran serves in the capacity as the headquarter of the Naval Aviation Branch of the Pakistan Navy, and grown to its present inventory of 41 multi role aircraft. The latest addition in the Air Arm is the ATR-72. 

From its inception, being a cost-effective solution, Naval Air Arm has depended upon Pakistan Air Force and Pakistan Army to meet the training requirement of air and ground crew. In April 1988, the Naval Aviation Training School (NATS) was established to impart conversion training to aircrew of the Pakistan Naval Air Arm. The school is also geared to train surface fleet officers and men to meet the various requirements of ship borne flight operations. Lately the school has also started to conduct Air Navigators Course, that had previously been conducted in Transport Conversion School of PAF.

History
Commissioning Orders for PNS Mehran were received in the office of the Commander Pakistan Fleet on 13 September 1975. Three 'D' Class houses from PNS Karsa were taken over on 18 September and thereafter the MES put in their efforts to prepare the place and surroundings for housing and commissioning of PNS Mehran. The work was completed 25 September, a day before PNS Mehran was formally commissioned on 26 September 1975.

PNS Mehran was commissioned by the Vice Chief of Naval Staff Rear Admiral L N Mungavan. On the first day strength of PNS Mehran was eight officers, four sailors and no aircraft. Although Sea King helicopters had been handed over to Pakistan Navy, they were still in the United Kingdom. The first commanding officer was then Captain Syed Fazl Rab PN (P No 456). PNS Mehran, since its inceptions, is efficiently supporting day and night operational activities of all the squadrons. Despite facing acute shortage in every sphere, the base has accomplished every task assigned.

A Westland Sea King helicopter was the first machine to fly from this Base. Breguet Atlantic and Sud Aviation Alouette aircraft soon joined the Naval Air Arm followed by Fokker F-27 Friendship aircraft. The 1990s saw an expansion in PN aviation with P3Cs and LYNX joining in.

the new millennium also saw an increased focus towards strengthening of this force and ex USN P3Cs, Harbin Z9EC, Hawker 850XP and ATR-72 were included in the fleet.

22 May 2011 attack 

On 22 May 2011, Tehreek-e-Taliban Pakistan claimed that its force of 8–20 armed men had attacked the base. Aircraft stationed in the base were destroyed using rocket propelled grenades out of the Pakistan Navy's five, P-3C Orion aircraft. though various claims have been made regarding numbers of terrorist only four dead bodies were practically found.

The attack was the third attack on Pakistani naval forces since American forces killed Osama bin Laden. A spokesman for the Pakistan Taliban says the raid was revenge for bin Laden's killing, however Pakistani naval officials believe the attacks are linked to two other attacks that took place on 26 and 28 April respectively, not bin Laden's death. Eyewitnesses have claimed that the attackers were dressed in naval uniforms and were aware of the security protocol at the base and behaved like soldiers. This contradicts the claim by Pakistan's Interior Minister, Rehman Malik who had claimed that the attackers had cut through barbed wire at a place on the perimeter where they could not be detected by security cameras, and that they were wearing black.

Operations
The Naval Air Arm at PNS Mehran is headed by Commander Naval Aviation (COMNAV). Under COMNAV, there are four Head of Departments (HODs) namely Commander Air (Cdr Air), Commander Air Engineering Department (Cdr AED), Commanding Officer MEHRAN (CO MEH) and Officer Commanding Naval Aviation Training School (OC NATS).

There are six squadrons under Cdr Air namely 28 Squadron (P-3C Orion), 29 Squadron (Hawker 800 and ATR 72), 27 Squadron (Fokker F27 Friendship), 111 Squadron (Westland Sea King), 222 Squadron (Harbin Z-9), and 333 Squadron (Aérospatiale Alouette III). All the operational/flying activities of the naval base are controlled by Cdr Air through the Officer Commanding (OC) of each Squadron. Cdr Air is further assisted by staff working directly under him.

Cdr AED is responsible for the maintenance and technical efficiency of all the aircraft.

CO MEHRAN is responsible for providing all logistics and administrative support to aviation units under COMNAV. Under him is the typical infrastructure of a naval unit which includes EXO, Supply Officer, Gunnery Officer, Communication Officer etc.

OC NATS is responsible for all sort of aviation related training of the Naval Air Arm. He is assisted by Training Cdr, Chief Flying Instructor (CFI) Rotary Wing, CFI Fixed wing and Chief Navigator Instructor (CNI). CFIs and CNI are further assisted by Instructor Pilots and Instructor Navigators under them.

Staff Officer (Operations) and Staff Maintenance Officer are responsible for advising and assisting COMNAV on matters related to Operations and Maintenance respectively.

A Base Flight Safety Officer is responsible for ensuring that safe flying practices are being followed by the squadrons. Quality Assurance Officer ensures that required quality standards are being maintained by the maintainers and technical departments.

Air Engineering Department
The Air Engineering Department (AED) was established in the mid-1970s at PNS Mehran with the assistance of the Pakistani Army and the Air Force. The AED initially began with limited first line maintenance of aircraft backed by rudimentary workshop facilities. Progressively, the scope of the Air Engineering Department expanded with the corresponding increase in aircraft inventory and their growing technical obligations. The AED, with a workforce of 1,500 service personnel and 300 civilian technicians, is capable of undertaking overhaul and rebuild of Fokker, Westland Sea King and Alouette III aircraft.

Functions of AED
The functions of the AED encompass diverse maintenance activities that range in sophistication and depth. The repair and maintenance work varies from basic inspections to complete stripping and rebuilding of aircraft. The AED performs the following functions.

 Provide technical advice and assistance to squadrons;
 Extend Second & Third Level maintenance support to squadrons;
 Undertake complete stripping, inspection, refurbishment and rebuild of rotary and fixed wing aircraft;
 Conduct Third and Fourth level maintenance on aircraft equipment;
 Design and embody aircraft and equipment modification;
 Undertake aircraft structural repairs; and
 Conduct and monitor training of air and ground crew.

Organisation 
The organisation is headed by the Commander Air Engineering Department.  The Commander AED is assisted by seven Group Officers to perform the functions efficiently.

References

External links 
 PNS Mehran
 PNS Mehran, Karachi
 Pakistan Navy, PNS Mehran

Mehran
Mehran
Mehran
Military installations in Karachi
Airports in Karachi